Amber Anderson (born 5 March 1992) is an English actress, pianist and model. She is best known for her roles as Jane Fairfax in the 2020 film Emma, Ciara Porter in J.K Rowling's crime drama series Strike, Lady Anne in The Riot Club (2014), and She in the Steve McQueen-directed Mr. Burberry (2016). She also starred as Lady Diana Mitford in Peaky Blinders (2022). She is also a pianist and violinist.

Personal life 
Anderson was born in Shepton Mallet, England and grew up near Inverness, Scotland.

She was Steiner educated  before studying at Aberdeen City Music School, with piano as her first study. She went on to study at Gordonstoun School on a double music and drama scholarship, the first of its kind especially awarded to Anderson.

In 2017, Anderson wrote an Instagram post accusing Harvey Weinstein of behaving inappropriately and harassing her for a personal relationship to further her career when she was 20.

Modelling 
Anderson has appeared in ads for brands such as Clarins, Burberry, Chanel and Kenzo. She has walked catwalk for Dior, Jean Paul Gaultier, Burberry, Hermes and Chanel.

She has worked with photographers such as Albert Watson, Mario Testino, Patrick Demarchelier, Nick Knight and Solve Sunsbo.

Awards
In January 2020, Anderson received the Vancouver Film Critics Circle's award for Best Supporting Actress in a Canadian Film for her performance as Jennifer Ellis in White Lie.

Filmography

Film

Television

References

External links 
 

Living people
English film actresses
English television actresses
1992 births
Actresses from Somerset
People from Shepton Mallet